In mathematical analysis, microlocal analysis comprises techniques developed from the 1950s onwards based on Fourier transforms related to the study of variable-coefficients-linear and nonlinear partial differential equations.  This includes generalized functions, pseudo-differential operators, wave front sets, Fourier integral operators, oscillatory integral operators, and paradifferential operators.

The term microlocal implies localisation not only with respect to location in the space, but also with respect to cotangent space directions at a given point. This gains in importance on manifolds of dimension greater than one.

See also
Algebraic analysis
Microfunction

External links
lecture notes by Richard Melrose 
newer lecture notes by Richard Melrose

 
Fourier analysis
Generalized functions